The Departmental Council of Vienne is the deliberative assembly of the French department of Vienne in the region of Nouvelle-Aquitaine. Its headquarters are in Poitiers.

The president of the Vienne departmental council is Alain Pichon (DVD). He was re-elected on 1 July 2021.

Vice Presidents

References 

Vienne
Vienne